Stanislas Dripaux (born: 3 August 1962) is a sailor from Épinal, France. who represented his country at the 1988 Summer Olympics in Busan, South Korea as crew member in the Soling. With helmsman Michel Kermarec and fellow crew members Xavier Phelipon they took the 6th place.

References

Living people
1962 births
Sailors at the 1988 Summer Olympics – Soling
Olympic sailors of France
French male sailors (sport)